Hadis fooladvand (borne ; , also Romanized as Hadis Fouladvand) is an Iranian actress. She is a graduate of architecture directing.

Career
She  married Rambod Shekar Aabi in 2010 who is also an actor but divorced in 2022. She started her acting career as a child. At the age of 12, she was trained by Golab Adineh and went on stage to play "Golhaye Doosti" (The Flowers of Friendship). Her first appearance in a movie was in Dasthaye Aloode (The Dirty Hands) directed by Siroos Alvand in 1999.

References

External links
 

1978 births
Living people
People from Tehran
Actresses from Tehran
Iranian film actresses
Iranian stage actresses
Iranian television actresses